The 800 nanometer process (800 nm process) is a level of semiconductor process technology that was reached in the 1989–1990 timeframe, by most leading semiconductor companies, such as Intel, ATI Technologies, and IBM.

Products featuring 0.8 µm manufacturing process
 Intel 80486 CPU launched in 1989 was manufactured using this process.
 microSPARC I launched in 1992
 First Intel P5 Pentium CPUs at 60 MHz and 66 MHz launched in 1993

References 

00800